Kaloyan Krastev (born 24 January 1999) is a Bulgarian footballer who currently plays as a forward for Beroe on loan from CSKA Sofia.

Career

Slavia Sofia 
Krastev made his senior debut for Slavia on 7 December 2015, coming on as a substitute for Daudet N'Dongala in a 3–0 win against Lokomotiv Plovdiv.

On 3 April 2017 he signed a professional contract with the team until 31 July 2020.

He scored his debut goal for the team in the league on 15 April 2017 in a match against Montana, won by Slavia with 4:3.

Bologna 
On 24 January 2018, Krastev signed a 4-year contract with the Serie A team Bologna with the transfer fee reported to be a 1.5 million euro.

Bеroe 
After seeing limited action with CSKA Sofia, in September 2022 Krastev was loaned out to Beroe.

International career

Youth levels
Krastev was called up for the Bulgaria U19 team for the 2017 European Under-19 Championship qualification from 22 to 27 March 2017. He scored the first goal in the match against France U19 which was won by Bulgaria 2–1. He became a hero for the team in the next match against Bosnia and Herzegovina U19, scoring 2 goals for the 3–1 win and qualifying Bulgaria for the knockout phase.

Senior
He made his debut for Bulgaria national football team on 2 September 2021 in a World Cup qualifier against Italy that ended in a 1–1 away draw. He substituted the goal-scorer Atanas Iliev in the 79th minute.

Career statistics

Club

References

External links
 

Living people
1999 births
Footballers from Sofia
Bulgarian footballers
Bulgaria youth international footballers
Bulgaria under-21 international footballers
Bulgaria international footballers
Association football forwards
PFC Slavia Sofia players
Bologna F.C. 1909 players
PFC CSKA Sofia players
First Professional Football League (Bulgaria) players
Bulgarian expatriate footballers
Expatriate footballers in Italy